Tanner Morgan (born April 17, 1999) is an American football quarterback for the Minnesota Golden Gophers.

Early life and high school career
Morgan was born on April 17, 1999. He originally attended Hazard High School in Hazard, Kentucky, before transferring to Ryle High School in Union, Kentucky prior to his junior year. As a senior, he passed 2,747 yards and 27 touchdowns. He originally committed to Western Michigan University to play college football for head coach P. J. Fleck but recommitted to the University of Minnesota after Fleck joined the school in 2017.

College career
Morgan redshirted his first year at Minnesota in 2017. He entered 2018 as a backup to Zack Annexstad but took over as the starter for the final six games of the season. Overall he played in nine games, completing 89 of 152 passes for 1,401 yards with nine touchdowns and six interceptions.

In 2019, Morgan set several school records including passing yards (3,253) and touchdowns (30). He also set a Big Ten Conference record in a victory over Purdue by completing 21 of 22 passes for a completion percentage of 95.5.

Statistics

Professional career
Morgan was selected by the Michigan Panthers eighth overall in the 2023 USFL Draft.

Personal life
Morgan is a Christian. His father, Ted, died from a brain tumor in July 2021.

References

External links
Minnesota Golden Gophers bio

1999 births
Living people
American football quarterbacks
Hazard High School alumni
Minnesota Golden Gophers football players
People from Boone County, Kentucky
Players of American football from Kentucky
Ryle High School alumni